Wayne Goddard (June 9, 1914 – September 22, 1984) was an American football player and coach. He served as the head football coach at his alma mater, Southeast Missouri State University, from 1947 to 1951, compiling a record of 10–30–5.  Goddard coached at Dexter High School in Dexter, Missouri before serving the United States Navy officer during World War II.  While in the service, he played for the 1942 Pensacola Naval Air Station Goslings football team. Goddard was later an assistant principal at Cape Central High School in Cape Girardeau, Missouri.

Head coaching record

College

References

1914 births
1984 deaths
20th-century American educators
American football tackles
Pensacola Naval Air Station Goslings football players
Southeast Missouri State Redhawks football coaches
Southeast Missouri State Redhawks football players
High school football coaches in Missouri
United States Navy personnel of World War II
United States Navy officers
People from Anna, Illinois
Coaches of American football from Illinois
Players of American football from Illinois
Military personnel from Illinois